The 2018–19 Super League Greece, or Super League Souroti for sponsorship reasons, was the 83rd season of the highest tier in league of Greek football and the 13th under its current name. The season started on 25 August 2018 and concluded on 22 May 2019 with the relegation play-offs.

AEK Athens were the defending champions. OFI and Aris joined as the promoted clubs from the 2017–18 Football League, replacing Platanias and Kerkyra who were relegated to the 2018–19 Football League.

PAOK won their third championship and their first one in 34 years, by beating Levadiakos on the penultimate round of the league. They also clinched the championship without a defeat, thus becoming the second club to do so in Greek football, after Panathinaikos in 1963–64.

PAS Giannina, Levadiakos and Apollon Smyrnis finished in the bottom 3 and were relegated to Super League 2, while OFI, who finished 13th,  faced Platanias who were runners-up of the 2018-19 Football League in the relegation play-offs on May 19 and May 22 for a place in the 2019–20 Super League. OFI won the play-offs with 3–2 on aggregate.

This was the last season with a 16-team championship. From the 2019–20 season, the league teams are going to be reduced to 14, and a playoff tournament will be introduced between the first six teams of the regular season, for a total of 36 games, in the style of the Cypriot First Division. Three teams relegated directly instead of the usual two and a fourth spot was decided between the 13th placed Super League team and the runner-up of the 2018–19 Football League. The fourth spot was a cause of controversy between the Super League and Greek Football Federation (EPO), however, the sporting court decided in favour of the play-off match in order to not completely diminish the chance for the second division runner-up to be promoted, as they would normally be promoted automatically in a normal season.

Teams
Sixteen teams will compete in the league – the top fourteen teams from the previous season, and two teams promoted from the Football League.

Teams promoted to the Super League

The first club to be promoted was OFI, after beating 1–0 Apollon Pontus on 29 April 2018. OFI would play in the Super League for the first time since the 2014–15 season.

The second and final club to be promoted was Aris, after beating 2–0 Karaiskakis on 29 April 2018. Aris would play in the Super League for the first time since the 2013–14 season.

Teams relegated to the Football League

The first club to be relegated was Platanias, who were relegated on 4 April 2018 following Apollon Smyrnis' 1–0 victory against PAS Giannina, ending their 6-year stay in the top flight.

The second and final club to be relegated was Kerkyra, who were relegated on 29 April 2018 following Lamia's 2–1 victory against PAS Giannina, ending their 2-year stay in the top flight.

Venues

Note: Table lists in alphabetical order.

Personnel, kits and TV channel

Managerial changes

League table

Results

Positions by round

The table lists the positions of teams after each week of matches. In order to preserve chronological evolvements, any postponed matches are not included in the round at which they were originally scheduled, but added to the full round they were played immediately afterwards.

Relegation play-offs

|+Summary

|}

OFI won 3–2 on aggregate and retained their spot in 2019–20 Super League. Platanias placed in 2019–20 Super League 2.

Season statistics

Top scorers

Top assists

Awards

Annual awards
Annual awards were announced on 28 January 2020.

Team of the Year

References

External links
Official website 

Greece
1
A1 Ethniki
A1 Ethniki
2018-19